Breon Stacey Peace (born 1971) is an American lawyer who has served as the United States attorney for the Eastern District of New York since October 2021.

Education

Peace received his Bachelor of Arts from the University of California, Berkeley in 1993 and his Juris Doctor from the New York University School of Law in 1996.

Career

Peace served as a law clerk for Judge Sterling Johnson Jr. of the United States District Court for the Eastern District of New York from 1997 to 1998. He was a partner at Cleary Gottlieb Steen & Hamilton in New York City from 2007 to 2022, and previously worked as an associate at the firm from 1996 to 1997, 1998 to 1999, and from 2003 to 2007. He was an acting assistant professor of clinical law at New York University School of Law from 2002 to 2003. He previously served as an Assistant United States Attorney in the United States Attorney's Office for the Eastern District of New York from 2000 to 2002.

U.S. attorney for Eastern District of New York 

In March 2021, Senator Chuck Schumer recommended Peace to serve as the United States Attorney for the Eastern District of New York. On August 10, 2021, President Joe Biden nominated Peace to be the United States attorney for the Eastern District of New York. On September 30, 2021, his nomination was reported out of committee by voice vote. On October 5, 2021, his nomination was confirmed in the United States Senate by voice vote. On October 15, 2021, he was sworn in as United States Attorney for the Eastern District of New York by United States Chief District Judge Margo K. Brodie.

References

External links
 Biography at U.S. Department of Justice

1971 births
Living people
20th-century American lawyers
20th-century African-American people
21st-century American lawyers
21st-century African-American people
African-American lawyers
Assistant United States Attorneys
Lawyers from New York City
Lawyers from Philadelphia
New York University School of Law alumni
New York University School of Law faculty
People associated with Cleary Gottlieb Steen & Hamilton
United States Attorneys for the Eastern District of New York
University of California, Berkeley alumni